Henza Island (平安座島, Henza-jima, Okinawan: Henza or Hyanza) is an islet in the Yokatsu Islands of Okinawa Prefecture. Japan. Situated next to Miyagi Island, the two are separated by a 3 to 10 meter wide channel.

Its only village, Yonashirohenza, is located in the very south of the island and has a population of roughly 1,800, with the rest of the island being used for oil refineries and tank farms. These oil refineries are restricted, meaning only the village and a road on the island's east side leading to Miyagi Island are open for public access.

References 

Yokatsu Islands